This is a list of Strict Baptist churches The term 'strict' refers to the strict or closed position held with regard to membership and communion. Such people are referred to as Strict and Particular Baptists.

Gospel Standard churches
Many Strict Baptist churches are affiliated with and recognized by the publishers of the Gospel Standard, a Strict Baptist magazine first published in 1835. Churches that align themselves with the Gospel Standard Magazine are known as "Gospel Standard Baptists" or "Gospel Standard Strict Baptists".

Outside the United Kingdom
Zion Chapel, Melbourne, Australia
Ebenezer Chapel, Ryde, New South Wales, Australia
Zion's Hope Chapel, Nobleford, Alberta, Canada
Hope Chapel, Chilliwack, British Columbia, Canada
PSSS Christchurch Bierton Particular Baptists, Rahim Yar Khan, Pakistan
The Old Paths Chapel, Choteau, Montana, USA
Zion Baptist Church, Grand Rapids, Michigan USA
Hope Strict Baptist Church, Sheboygan, Wisconsin, USA

United Kingdom

Other Strict Baptist churches
The term Strict Baptist was used up until recent decades by other sizeable groups of Calvinistic Baptist churches in England that did not adhere to the Gospel Standard Articles or Magazine.  Many were members of regional Strict Baptist Associations, but from about 1980 onwards assemblies, regional associations, and charities connected with this movement gradually adopted the appellation "Grace Baptist". Lists of churches can be found on the websites of the various regional Grace Baptist associations.

The churches listed below were added to this section before the above information about Grace Baptists, and may well be unrelated.
Bethel Strict Baptist Chapel, Robertsbridge
Ebenezer Particular Baptist Chapel, Hastings
Providence Strict Baptist Chapel, Burgess Hill
Rye Particular Baptist Chapel
Shover's Green Baptist Chapel
Strict and Particular Baptist Chapel, Waddesdon
Zion Chapel, Newick

See also
 Grace Baptist

References

Bibliography

 
Strict Baptist